Vesiculomyces is a genus of fungi in the Peniophoraceae family.

Russulales
Russulales genera